Hellena Wrappah (born 12 September 1973) is a Ghanaian sprinter. She competed in the women's 200 metres at the 2000 Summer Olympics.

References

1973 births
Living people
Athletes (track and field) at the 2000 Summer Olympics
Ghanaian female sprinters
Olympic athletes of Ghana
Athletes (track and field) at the 1994 Commonwealth Games
Commonwealth Games competitors for Ghana
Place of birth missing (living people)
Olympic female sprinters